Frank Hughes Memorial Library is a historic library building located at Liberty, Clay County, Missouri. It was designed by the architectural firm Wight and Wight and built in 1940.  It is a one-story, rectangular Classical Revival style brick building.  It has a gable roof with a wide elaborate cornice.  It features a flat-roofed portico feature a wide, simple wood entablature topped with a rooftop balustrade.

It was listed on the National Register of Historic Places in 1992.  It is located in the Jewell-Lightburne Historic District.

References

Individually listed contributing properties to historic districts on the National Register in Missouri
Libraries on the National Register of Historic Places in Missouri
Neoclassical architecture in Missouri
Buildings and structures in Clay County, Missouri
National Register of Historic Places in Clay County, Missouri
Liberty, Missouri
Library buildings completed in 1940